The Gelao people (also spelled Gelo) (Gelao: Klau) are an ethnic group of China and Vietnam. They form one of the 56 ethnic groups officially recognized by the People's Republic of China. However, many Gelao are also variously classified as Yi, Miao, and Zhuang by the Chinese government.

They number approximately 438,200 and are mainly located in Gelao autonomous counties in western part of Guizhou, such as Wuchuan Gelao and Miao Autonomous County and Daozhen Gelao and Miao Autonomous County in Zunyi. They are also found in Liupanshui, Anshun, Dafang, and Bijie. Some live in western Guangxi (Longlin Various Nationalities Autonomous County), southeastern Yunnan and southern Sichuan. The main religion practiced is Taoism with a small but significant Buddhist minority.

History
The Gelao people are often considered to be the aboriginal inhabitants of Guizhou. The ancestors of the Gelao were the Rau peoples, who made up the population of ancient Yelang.

Language

The Gelao languages belong to the Kra–Dai language family. Today, only a small minority of the Gelao still speak this language. Since the various Gelao dialects differ greatly from each other, Mandarin has been used as a lingua franca and is now the main language spoken by Gelaos. Hmong, Nuosu, and Bouyei are also used.

Culture
The traditional suits of the men consist of jacket done up to a side and long pants.  The women wear short jackets and narrow skirts divided into three parts: the head office is elaborate in red wool while the other two are of fabric bordered in black and white colors.  Men and women wear long scarves.

In their traditional music, the Gelao use a two-stringed fiddle with a body made from a cow horn, called the jiaohu (角胡; pinyin: jiǎohú).

The Gelao people have their own language, Gelao . At present, only more than a thousand Gelao people can speak this language. The Gelao language differs greatly from place to place due to scattered living. Most Gelao people speak many languages such as Chinese, Miao, Yi, and Bouyei.

Gelao folk circulates oral literature such as poetry and proverbs. Ancient folk songs consist of long and short sentences of varying numbers of words. In the past two or three hundred years, they have been greatly influenced by the genre of Han poetry, and many have borrowed Chinese words and phrases.

Language
It was previously thought that the Gelao people only had a spoken language, not a written one. However, in September 2008, The History of Jiu Tian Da Ling (English: Record of the Nine Heavens) was found in Guizhou. The book is kept by a Gelao person with a surname of Li in Qianbei, whose ancestors were from the Song dynasty. A descendant of King Li Wentong of Gulao, he himself does not know what kind of book this is, but he has always inherited his ancestral teachings and regards this book as a treasure. The discovery of Record of the Nine Heavens fully proved that the Gelao people is an ancient people with a long history and splendid culture. It not only has a written language, but it was also the earliest nation that advocated the concept of "harmony and harmony." The inventors of tea, fireworks, copper, iron, etc., also proved that the Gelao tribe had their own words.

However, through identification, the distribution area of the Gelao ethnic group described in Record of the Nine Heavens is consistent with the local declaration after the mid-1980s (for example, it was declared that the birthplace of Gelao was in Wuchuan, while the core area of Yelang was ignored in Panjiang, Chishui, Hebei), deviating from the local history records of the Ming and Qing dynasties. Also, the description of the ancient song "Sue Genyou" in Gelao, and the grammatical errors of the classical Chinese and Gelao in "The History of Nine Heavens" contain many grammatical errors, hinting at the possibility of a modern-day forgery.

The Gelao people living in the western part of Guizhou, such as Anshun, used to have Gelao characters made of six Chinese characters, which are used to record some folk songs.

Subgroups
The Gelao consist of various subgroups. Their historical exonyms, given in a provincial ethnic gazetteer from the Republic of China era, include the following.

Flowery Gelao 花仡佬, in Qianwei 前卫, Pingfa 平伐司, Yongning 永宁州, Shibing 施秉, Longquan 龙泉, Huangping 黄平
Red Gelao 红仡佬, in Qingshan 青山司, Anping 安平县, Renhuai 仁怀县, Liping 黎平府
Jiantou/Cut-Head Gelao 剪头仡佬, in Guiding 贵定, Shibing 施秉, Huangping 黄平, Yongning 永宁
Tooth-Hitting Gelao 打牙仡佬, in Pingyue 平越, Qianxi 黔西, Anping 安平, Yongping 永宁, Pingyuan 平远, Huangping 黄平, Qingzhen 清镇
Guoquan/Pot-Circle Gelao 锅圈仡佬, in Pingyuan 平远, Anping 安平, Dading 大定
Datie/Iron-Hit Gelao 打铁仡佬, in Pingyuan 平远州
Pipao/Robe Gelao 披袍仡佬, in Pingyuan 平远, Anping 安平, Dading 大定
Shui/Water Gelao 水仡佬, in Yuqing 余庆, Zhenyuan 镇远, Shibing 施秉, Yongning 永宁
Tu/Native/Indigenous Gelao 土仡佬, in Weining 威宁
Yayi/Elegant Gelao 雅意仡佬, in Yongning 永宁

Yi people
The Yi, who number no more 3,000 people, live in the Chishui (赤水) area in Xuyong County, Sichuan, which is on the border with Guizhou. They are a subgroup of the Gelao but have a distinctive history. The Yi call themselves the gau13. In comparison, the Gelao of Xinzhai 新寨, Puding 普定, Guizhou, call themselves the qau13. The Yi live in:

 Chishui village 赤水镇, Xuyong County 叙永县, Sichuan
 Napangou 纳盘沟, Gulin County 古蔺县, Sichuan. According to the Gulin County Gazetteer (1993), ethnic Gelao and Yi are found on the northern banks of the Chishui River 赤水河, in Napan township 纳盘乡.
 Xiaohe 小河, Puyi 普宜, Bijie County 毕节县, Guizhou
 Yindi 阴底, Bijie County 毕节县, Guizhou

The Yi have been mentioned since the Tang dynasty, and were said to have come from the north. The Yi are also noted for their belief in the Zitong (子童) Bodhisattva (菩萨).

Unlike most Gelao dialects, the Yi dialect uses a Loloish-derived numeral system (Zhang 1993:424).

Gelao in Vietnam
In Vietnam, the Gelao are recognized as an official ethnic group. There are 2,636 Gelaos in Vietnam (2009), mostly inhabited in the karst plateau Hoàng Su Phì and Đồng Văn districts of Hà Giang province. They represent a majority in Túng Sán commune of Hoàng Su Phì.

See also
Languages of China

References

Hoàng Thị Cáp. 2013. Văn hóa dân gian của người Cơ Lao Dỏ. Hanoi: Nhà xuất bản văn hóa thông tin.

External links
 http://www.china.org.cn/e-groups/shaoshu/shao-2-gelo.htm
 "Heaven Book" of the Gelao people
 Ethnologue report on the Gelao language

 
Ethnic groups officially recognized by China
Ethnic groups in Vietnam